Craigslist Joe is a 2012 documentary film that follows Joseph Garner for a month of travel across the United States, solely supporting himself via contacting people on the website Craigslist. He spent the month without using any form of currency and without contacting people he already knew, relying on the "kindness and generosity" of Craigslist users.

History
Garner came up with the concept for the documentary during the Great Recession in 2008, while working as the assistant director for The Hangover: "The country was falling apart around me, people losing their homes, people just out on their own. So I got to thinking: If I lost everything, what would happen? I'd probably be OK, because I have great friends and family. But what if I didn't?"

Another theme Garner hoped to explore in the film was the effect of social media and other technology on social interactions.

He hired a cameraman, Kevin Flint, via Craigslist a week before beginning his travels in Los Angeles. Flint received a food stipend, so was not completely dependent on Craigslist users. Packing light, Garner's only possessions during the 31-day experiment were "a laptop, a new cell phone with a new number he hadn't shared with anyone, a new email address, a passport, toothbrush and the clothes on his back". All of the meals, shelter, and transportation would be solely acquired from the connections which he made on Craigslist.

Garner and Flint journeyed across America, visiting many major cities, including New York, Chicago, Tallahassee, New Orleans, Portland, and San Francisco (where he managed to meet Craigslist's founder, Craig Newmark). Garner even took a pitstop to visit Mexico with one of the connections that he made.

Flint recorded some 80 hours of footage in their 31 days of travels. The original rough cut of the documentary was 12 hours long, according to Garner.

Upon returning home, Garner was greeted by his parents and closest friends. When asked by his mother how to describe the experience, he can only come up with the word "inspiring". "The generosity, and the stories that they share, and the connections that I've made in one month is so deep."

Reception
Craigslist Joe elicited mixed reactions. Drew Prindle, writing for Digital Trends, said that "The doc definitely has a few flaws, but they are mostly overshadowed by its numerous strengths." Variety's Dennis Harvey opined that the movie was shallow and bland.

Several critics, including The Hollywood Reporter's John DeFore, Slant Magazine's Diego Costa, and Village Voice's Ernest Hardy, have pointed out that Garner's "experiment" is somewhat "limited", since Garner, "a young, middle-class white man", enjoys social privileges that many impoverished individuals don't share.

References

External links

2012 documentary films
2012 films
American documentary films
Craigslist
Documentary films about the Internet
Films about social media
Films produced by Zach Galifianakis
2010s English-language films
2010s American films